Zainapora is a village in Shopian district in the Indian union territory of Jammu and Kashmir. It is also known as land of springs because of its countless springs.

The village has a horticulture department which has second largest orchards under cultivation in Asia.

History
The village got its name from the great medieval period king Zain-ul-Abidin, who used to visit a Sufi saint living in the town.

Demographics
The Village had a population of 1739 as per the data released by 2011 Census of India. The average sex ratio of Zainapora is 961.

Zainapora has a higher literacy rate compared to Jammu and Kashmir. As per 2011 census, the literacy rate of Zainapora was 70.01%.

Education
 Government Higher Secondary School Zainapora 
 Government Degree College Zainapora 
NIPS zainapora
 Government High School Aglar
 Jawahar Navodaya Vidyalaya Shopian (JNV Aglar)
 Al Fallah English Medium School Aglar

Transport
Zainapora is connected with Shopian, Pulwama via  Aglar, Kulgam and Anantnag.
The nearest railway station to Zainapora is Bijbehara railway station.

Healthcare
Zainapora has a Sub-district hospital and several other government health care centres in adjoining areas of the sub district.

See also
 Aglar
 Litter
 Wachi
 Chitragam
 Anantnag
 Bijbehara
 Pulwama
 Awantipora
 Srinagar
 Shopian

References

Cities and towns in Shopian district